Burchia is a genus of sea snails, marine gastropod mollusks in the family Pseudomelatomidae.

Species
Species within the genus Burchia include:
 Burchia semiinflata (Grant & Gale, 1931)
 Burchia spectabilis Sysoev & Taylor, 1997
Species brought into synonymy
 Burchia redondoensis (T. Burch, 1938): synonym of Burchia semiinflata (Grant & Gale, 1931) 
 Burchia clionella Dall, 1908: synonym of Leucosyrinx clionella Dall, 1908

References

  P. Bartsch, Burchia, a new genus of Turrids; The Nautilus vol. 57 (4)

External links
 
 Bouchet, P.; Kantor, Y. I.; Sysoev, A.; Puillandre, N. (2011). A new operational classification of the Conoidea (Gastropoda). Journal of Molluscan Studies. 77(3): 273-308

 
Pseudomelatomidae
Gastropod genera